Playa Porto Marie (Playa Porto Maria in Papiamento) is a beach on the Caribbean island of Curaçao, located near the village of Sint Willibrordus, at the Porto Marie Bay. The beach is used as a starting point for scuba diving and snorkeling. There is a small bar.

Porto Marie Beach is experimenting with artificial coral reefs in order to improve the reef's condition, having placed hundreds of artificial coral blocks.

References
Curaçao Beaches, Tourism Curaçao

Beaches of Curaçao